2003 NCAA Division I men's soccer tournament was a tournament of 48 teams from NCAA Division I across the nation who played for the NCAA Championship. This year's College Cup Final Four was held at Columbus Crew Stadium in Columbus, Ohio. All the other games were played at the home field of the higher seeded. The final was held on December 14, 2003. St. John's, Maryland, Santa Clara, and Indiana qualified for the Final Four. St. John's defeated Maryland, and Indiana beat Santa Clara. In the final Indiana defeated St. John's, 2–1.

The tournament started on November 21, 2003. The first round was played on November 21 and 22. The second round on the November 26, and the third round on the November 29-30. The Regional Finals were played on December 5-7.

Seeded Teams

Regional 1

Regional 2

Regional 3

Regional 4

Final Four – Columbus Crew Stadium, Columbus, Ohio

References

NCAA Division I
NCAA Division I Men's Soccer Tournament seasons
NCAA Division I men's soccer tournament
NCAA Division I men's soccer tournament
NCAA Division I men's soccer tournament